This is a list of hospitals and hospital networks in Belgium as of August 2019, sorted per region and per province. For each hospital or hospital network, the list includes if applicable their specialisation, the municipalities where they are located, any international hospital accreditation they have obtained as well as their number of hospital beds (an indicator of the overall size and importance of the hospital or network). Note that in Dutch a hospital is called ziekenhuis, kliniek or hospitaal, whilst in French a hospital is called hôpital, centre hospitalier or clinique. Some common abbreviations in this list are:

 'AZ' indicates a general hospital (Dutch: Algemeen Ziekenhuis).
 'UZ' indicates a university hospital (Dutch: Universitair Ziekenhuis), as does 'CHU' (French: Centre Hospitalier Universitaire).
 'CHR' indicates a regional hospital, mostly found in larger towns and cities and their metropolitan area (French: Centre Hospitalier Régional), as does 'RZ' (Dutch: Regionaal Ziekenhuis).
 'PZ' or 'PC' indicates a psychiatric hospital (Dutch: Psychiatrisch Ziekenhuis or Psychiatrisch Centrum), as does 'HP', 'CP' or 'CHP' (French: Hôpital Psychiatrique, Centre Psychiatrique or Centre Hospitalier Psychiatrique).
 'UPC' indicates a psychiatric hospital associated with a university or a psychiatric division of a university hospital (Dutch: Universitair Psychiatrisch Centrum).

Flemish Region

West Flanders

General hospitals 

Jan Yperman Ziekenhuis
Hospital sites located in Ypres, Poperinge and Wervik
Has obtained accreditation by the JCI
Disposes of 523 beds (all sites)

AZ Delta
Hospital sites located in Roeselare, Menen and Torhout
Has obtained accreditation by the JCI
Disposes of 1,396 beds (all sites)

AZ Zeno
Hospital sites located in Blankenberge and Knokke-Heist
Has obtained accreditation by the NIAZ
Disposes of 334 beds (all sites)

AZ Sint-Jan
Hospital sites located in Bruges and Ostend
Has obtained accreditation by the JCI
Disposes of 1,182 beds (all sites)

AZ Sint-Lucas
Located in Bruges
Has obtained accreditation by the NIAZ
Disposes of 419 beds

AZ Damiaan
Located in Ostend
Has obtained accreditation by the JCI
Disposes of 523 beds

Sint-Jozefskliniek
Located in Izegem
Has obtained accreditation by the JCI
Disposes of 271 beds

AZ West
Located in Veurne
Has obtained accreditation by the JCI
Disposes of 224 beds

Sint-Andriesziekenhuis
Located in Tielt
Has obtained accreditation by the JCI
Disposes of 266 beds

AZ Groeninge
Located in Kortrijk
Has obtained accreditation by the JCI
Disposes of 1,054 beds

O.L.V. van Lourdesziekenhuis
Located in Waregem
Has obtained accreditation by the NIAZ
Disposes of 267 beds

Specialised hospitals 

Koningin Elisabeth Instituut
Rehabilitation hospital
Located in Koksijde
Has not obtained hospital-wide accreditation
Disposes of 165 beds

Revalidatiecentrum IMBO
Rehabilitation hospital
Located in Ostend
Has not obtained hospital-wide accreditation
Disposes of 125 beds

PZ Onzelievevrouw
Psychiatric hospital
Located in Bruges
Has obtained accreditation by the NIAZ
Disposes of 412 beds

PTC Rustenburg
Psychiatric hospital
Located in Bruges
Has not obtained hospital-wide accreditation
Disposes of 72 beds

PC Sint-Amandus
Psychiatric hospital
Located in Beernem
Has obtained accreditation by the NIAZ
Disposes of 459 beds

Kliniek Sint-Jozef
Psychiatric hospital
Located in Pittem
Has not obtained hospital-wide accreditation
Disposes of 197 beds

PZ Heilige Familie
Psychiatric hospital
Located in Kortrijk
Has obtained accreditation by the NIAZ
Disposes of 120 beds

PZ Heilig Hart
Psychiatric hospital
Located in Ypres
Has not obtained hospital-wide accreditation
Disposes of 347 beds

PC Menen
Psychiatric hospital
Located in Menen
Has not obtained hospital-wide accreditation
Disposes of 233 beds

East Flanders

General hospitals 

AZ Sint-Blasius
Hospital sites located in Dendermonde and Zele
Has obtained accreditation by the JCI
Disposes of 438 beds (all sites)

Onze-Lieve-Vrouwziekenhuis
Hospital sites located in Aalst, Ninove and Flemish Brabant
Has obtained accreditation by the JCI
Disposes of 844 beds (all sites)

Algemeen Stedelijk Ziekenhuis
Hospital sites located in Aalst, Geraardsbergen and Wetteren
Has obtained accreditation by the NIAZ
Disposes of 568 beds (all sites)

AZ Oudenaarde
Located in Oudenaarde
Has obtained accreditation by the NIAZ
Disposes of 235 beds

AZ Alma
Located in Eeklo
Has obtained accreditation by the NIAZ
Disposes of 442 beds

Sint-Vincentiusziekenhuis
Located in Deinze
Has obtained accreditation by the NIAZ
Disposes of 170 beds

AZ Sint-Elisabeth
Located in Zottegem
Has obtained accreditation by the NIAZ
Disposes of 333 beds

AZ Lokeren
Located in Lokeren
Has obtained accreditation by the NIAZ
Disposes of 170 beds

AZ Glorieux
Located in Ronse
Has obtained accreditation by the JCI
Disposes of 340 beds

AZ Nikolaas
Hospital sites located in Sint-Niklaas, Temse and Beveren
Has obtained accreditation by the NIAZ
Disposes of 810 beds (all sites)

AZ Jan Palfijn
Located in Ghent
Has obtained accreditation by the NIAZ
Disposes of 526 beds

AZ Maria Middelares
Located in Ghent
Has obtained accreditation by the JCI
Disposes of 542 beds

AZ Sint-Lucas
Hospital sites located in Ghent
Has obtained accreditation by the NIAZ
Disposes of 779 beds (all sites)

UZ Gent (associated with Ghent University)
Located in Ghent
Has obtained accreditation by the NIAZ
Disposes of 1,049 beds

Specialised hospitals 

PC Dr. Guislain
Psychiatric hospital
Hospital sites located in Ghent
Has obtained accreditation by the NIAZ
Disposes of 311 beds (all sites)

PC Gent-Sleidinge
Psychiatric hospital
Hospital sites located in Ghent and Evergem
Has not obtained hospital-wide accreditation
Disposes of 320 beds (all sites)

Karus
Psychiatric hospital
Hospital sites located in Ghent and Melle
Has not obtained hospital-wide accreditation
Disposes of 472 beds (all sites)

PC Sint-Jan
Psychiatric hospital
Located in Eeklo
Has not obtained hospital-wide accreditation
Disposes of 201 beds

PC Sint-Jan Baptist
Psychiatric hospital
Located in Zelzate
Has obtained accreditation by the NIAZ
Disposes of 219 beds

PC Sint-Hiëronymus
Psychiatric hospital
Located in Sint-Niklaas
Has not obtained hospital-wide accreditation
Disposes of 220 beds

APZ Sint-Lucia
Psychiatric hospital
Hospital sites located in Beveren and Sint-Niklaas
Has not obtained hospital-wide accreditation
Disposes of 288 beds

PC Sint-Franciscus - De Pelgrim
Psychiatric hospital
Hospital sites located in Oosterzele and Zottegem
Has not obtained hospital-wide accreditation
Disposes of 223 beds

PC Ariadne
Psychiatric hospital
Located in Lede
Has obtained accreditation by the NIAZ
Disposes of 185 beds

Antwerp

General hospitals 

Ziekenhuis Netwerk Antwerpen
Hospital sites located in Antwerp and Zoersel
Has obtained accreditation by the JCI
Disposes of 1,955 beds (all sites)

Gasthuiszusters Antwerpen
Hospital sites located in Antwerp and Mortsel
Has obtained accreditation by the JCI
Disposes of 1,012 beds (all sites)

AZ Monica (includes the Eeuwfeestkliniek)
Hospital sites located in Antwerp
Has obtained accreditation by the JCI
Disposes of 466 beds (all sites)

UZA (associated with the University of Antwerp)
Located in Edegem
Has obtained accreditation by the JCI
Disposes of 573 beds

AZ Klina
Hospital sites located in Brasschaat and Wuustwezel
Has obtained accreditation by the JCI
Disposes of 581 beds (all sites)

AZ Rivierenland
Hospital sites located in Bornem, Rumst and Willebroek
Has obtained accreditation by the NIAZ
Disposes of 416 beds (all sites)

AZ Turnhout
Hospital sites located in Turnhout
Has obtained accreditation by the NIAZ
Disposes of 647 beds (all sites)

AZ Sint-Dimpna
Located in Geel
Has obtained accreditation by the NIAZ
Disposes of 294 beds

Imeldaziekenhuis
Located in Bonheiden
Has obtained accreditation by the NIAZ
Disposes of 502 beds

AZ Sint-Elisabeth
Located in Herentals
Has obtained accreditation by the NIAZ
Disposes of 243 beds

AZ Sint-Jozef
Located in Malle
Has obtained accreditation by the NIAZ
Disposes of 250 beds

Heilig Hartziekenhuis Mol
Located in Mol
Has obtained accreditation by the NIAZ
Disposes of 183 beds

Heilig Hartziekenhuis Lier
Located in Lier
Has obtained accreditation by the NIAZ
Disposes of 451 beds

AZ Sint-Maarten
Located in Mechelen
Has obtained accreditation by the NIAZ
Disposes of 643 beds

Specialised hospitals 

Revalidatieziekenhuis RevArte
Rehabilitation hospital
Located in Edegem
Has obtained accreditation by the NIAZ
Disposes of 194 beds

Ziekenhuis Netwerk Antwerpen: PZ Stuivenberg
Psychiatric hospital (part of ZNA network)
Located in Antwerp
Has obtained accreditation by the JCI
Disposes of 313 beds

UPC Duffel (associated with UZA)
Psychiatric hospital
Located in Duffel
Has not obtained hospital-wide accreditation
Disposes of 601 beds

Multiversum
Psychiatric hospital
Hospital sites located in Boechout and Mortsel
Has obtained accreditation by the NIAZ
Disposes of 591 beds (all sites)

PZ Bethaniënhuis
Psychiatric hospital
Hospital sites located in Kapellen and Zoersel
Has not obtained hospital-wide accreditation
Disposes of 621 beds (all sites)

OPZ Geel
Psychiatric hospital
Located in Geel
Has not obtained hospital-wide accreditation
Disposes of 316 beds and 431 places in family care

Flemish Brabant

General hospitals 

AZ Sint-Maria
Located in Halle
Has obtained accreditation by the NIAZ
Disposes of 350 beds

Onze-Lieve-Vrouwziekenhuis
Hospital sites located in Asse and East Flanders
Has obtained accreditation by the JCI
Disposes of 844 beds (all sites)

AZ Jan Portaels
Located in Vilvoorde
Has obtained accreditation by the NIAZ
Disposes of 406 beds

RZ Heilig Hart Leuven
Located in Leuven
Has obtained accreditation by the NIAZ
Disposes of 287 beds

RZ Heilig Hart Tienen
Hospital sites located in Aarschot and Tienen
Has obtained accreditation by the NIAZ
Disposes of 303 beds (all sites)

AZ Diest
Hospital sites located in Diest
Has obtained accreditation by the JCI
Disposes of 214 beds (all sites)

UZ Leuven (associated with the KU Leuven)
Hospital sites located in Leuven and Lubbeek
Has obtained accreditation by the JCI
Disposes of 1,758 beds (all sites)

Specialised hospitals 

Revalidatieziekenhuis Inkendaal
Rehabilitation hospital
Located in Sint-Pieters-Leeuw
Has obtained accreditation by the NIAZ
Disposes of 178 beds

National Multiple Sclerosis Centre
Rehabilitation hospital
Located in Steenokkerzeel
Has obtained accreditation by the JCI
Disposes of 120 beds

PZ Sint-Annendael
Psychiatric hospital
Located in Diest
Has obtained accreditation by the NIAZ
Disposes of 178 beds

UPC KU Leuven (associated with the KU Leuven)
Psychiatric hospital
Hospital sites located in Kortenberg and Leuven
Has obtained accreditation by the JCI
Disposes of 596 beds (all sites)

UPC Sint-Kamillus (associated with the KU Leuven)
Psychiatric hospital
Hospital sites located in Bierbeek and Leuven
Has obtained accreditation by the NIAZ
Disposes of 385 beds (all sites)

PZ Sint-Alexius
Psychiatric hospital
Located in Grimbergen
Has obtained accreditation by the NIAZ
Disposes of 169 beds

PK Alexianen Tienen
Psychiatric hospital
Hospital sites located in Leuven and Tienen
Has obtained accreditation by the NIAZ
Disposes of 300 beds (all sites)

Limburg

General hospitals 

Jessa Ziekenhuis
Hospital sites located in Hasselt and Herk-de-Stad
Has obtained accreditation by the NIAZ
Disposes of 981 beds (all sites)

Ziekenhuis Oost-Limburg
Hospital sites located in Genk and Lanaken
Has obtained accreditation by the JCI
Disposes of 811 beds (all sites)

Sint-Franciscusziekenhuis
Located in Heusden-Zolder
Has obtained accreditation by the NIAZ
Disposes of 268 beds

Sint-Trudo Ziekenhuis
Located in Sint-Truiden
Has obtained accreditation by the JCI
Disposes of 310 beds

Ziekenhuis Maas en Kempen
Located in Maaseik
Has obtained accreditation by the NIAZ
Disposes of 213 beds

Mariaziekenhuis Noord-Limburg
Located in Pelt
Has obtained accreditation by the NIAZ
Disposes of 333 beds

AZ Vesalius
Hospital sites located in Bilzen and Tongeren
Has obtained accreditation by the NIAZ
Disposes of 326 beds (all sites)

Specialised hospitals 

Revalidatie & MS Centrum
Rehabilitation hospital
Located in Pelt
Has obtained accreditation by the NIAZ
Disposes of 120 beds

PZ Asster
Psychiatric hospital
Hospital sites located in Sint-Truiden
Has not obtained hospital-wide accreditation
Disposes of 581 beds (all sites)

Medisch Centrum Sint-Jozef
Psychiatric hospital
Located in Bilzen
Has obtained accreditation by the NIAZ
Disposes of 330 beds

Kinderpsychiatrisch Centrum Genk
Psychiatric hospital
Located in Genk
Has not obtained hospital-wide accreditation
Disposes of 27 beds

OPZ Rekem
Psychiatric hospital
Located in Lanaken
Has obtained accreditation by the NIAZ
Disposes of 288 beds

Brussels-Capital Region 
Due to its bilingual nature, hospitals in the Brussels-Capital Region can be either monolingual Dutch, monolingual French or bilingual depending on their nature. University hospitals belong to one of the two linguistic communities and are therefore monolingual Dutch or French by law. Other public hospitals managed by a public authority have to be bilingual by law. Private hospitals not managed by a public authority are legally not bound to either language, but most cater to both. However, all hospital emergency services in the Brussels-Capital Region (no matter if they're part of a public or private hospital) are required to be bilingual, since patients transported by emergency ambulance do not have a free choice to which hospital they will be brought. Mind that this is only the de iure situation, de facto are some hospitals that are legally required to be bilingual seriously lacking in personnel that's proficient in the other language. This list indicates whether hospitals or hospital networks are officially monolingual or bilingual. The name of the bilingual hospitals is also given in the two languages.

Additionally, hospitals where younger members of the Belgian royal family were born are indicated with an asterisk (*).

General hospitals 

UMC Sint-Pieter / CHU Saint-Pierre (associated with the ULB and VUB)
Hospital sites located in the City of Brussels
Has not obtained hospital-wide accreditation
Disposes of 582 beds (all sites)
Bilingual Dutch-French

UVC Brugmann / CHU Brugmann (associated with the ULB and VUB)
Hospital sites located in Laeken, Neder-Over-Heembeek and Schaerbeek
Has not obtained hospital-wide accreditation
Disposes of 853 beds (all sites)
Bilingual Dutch-French

UZ Brussel (associated with the VUB)
Located in Jette
Has obtained accreditation by the JCI
Disposes of 721 beds
Monolingual Dutch

Cliniques universitaires Saint-Luc (*) (associated with the UCLouvain)
Located in Woluwe-Saint-Lambert
Has obtained accreditation by ACI
Disposes of 973 beds
Monolingual French

Hôpital Erasme (*) (associated with the ULB)
Hospital sites located in Anderlecht, Laeken and Woluwe-Saint-Lambert
Has not obtained hospital-wide accreditation
Disposes of 858 beds
Monolingual French

Iris Ziekenhuizen Zuid / Hôpitaux Iris Sud
Hospital sites located in Anderlecht, Etterbeek, Forest and Ixelles
Has not obtained hospital-wide accreditation
Disposes of 550 beds (all sites)
Bilingual Dutch-French

Kliniek Sint-Jan / Clinique Saint-Jean (*)
Hospital sites located in the City of Brussels, Jette and Saint-Josse-ten-Noode
Has not obtained hospital-wide accreditation
Disposes of 548 beds (all sites)
Bilingual Dutch-French (not subject to language laws)

Europa Ziekenhuizen / Cliniques de l'Europe
Hospital sites located in Etterbeek and Uccle
Has not obtained hospital-wide accreditation
Disposes of 715 beds (all sites)
Bilingual Dutch-French (not subject to language laws)

CHIREC
Hospital sites located in Anderlecht, Auderghem, Ganshoren and Walloon Brabant
Has not obtained hospital-wide accreditation
Disposes of 1,052 beds (all sites)
Bilingual Dutch-French (not subject to language laws)

Queen Astrid Military Hospital (part of the Armed Forces)
Located in Neder-Over-Heembeek
Has not obtained hospital-wide accreditation
Disposes of an unknown number of beds
Bilingual Dutch-French (military institution)

Specialised hospitals 

Institut Jules Bordet (associated with the ULB)
Cancer hospital
Located in Anderlecht
Has not obtained hospital-wide accreditation
Disposes of 160 beds
Bilingual Dutch-French

UKZKF / HUDERF (associated with UVC/CHU Brugmann)
Children's hospital
Located in Laeken
Has obtained accreditation by ACI
Disposes of 178 beds
Bilingual Dutch-French

SILVA medical
Geriatric, rehabilitation and psychiatric hospital
Hospital sites located in Molenbeek-Saint-Jean and Walloon Brabant
Has not obtained hospital-wide accreditation
Disposes of 440 beds (all sites)
Bilingual Dutch-French (not subject to language laws)

Valisana (associated with Saint-Luc)
Rehabilitation and psychiatric hospital
Hospital sites located in Saint-Josse-ten-Noode and Sint-Agatha-Berchem
Has not obtained hospital-wide accreditation
Disposes of 275 beds (all sites)
Bilingual Dutch-French (not subject to language laws)

Centre Hospitalier Jean Titeca
Psychiatric hospital
Located in Schaerbeek
Has not obtained hospital-wide accreditation
Disposes of 255 beds
Monolingual French (not subject to language laws)

Epsylon
Psychiatric hospital
Hospital sites located in Uccle
Has not obtained hospital-wide accreditation
Disposes of 312 beds (all sites)
Monolingual French (not subject to language laws)

Kliniek Zonder Zorgen / Clinique Sans Souci
Psychiatric hospital
Located in Jette
Has not obtained hospital-wide accreditation
Disposes of 145 beds
Bilingual Dutch-French (not subject to language laws)

Psycho-sociaal Centrum Sint-Alexius
Psychiatric hospital
Located in Ixelles
Has not obtained hospital-wide accreditation
Disposes of 44 beds
Monolingual Dutch (not subject to language laws)

Walloon Region

Walloon Brabant

General hospitals 

Clinique Saint-Pierre
Located in Ottignies-Louvain-la-Neuve
Has obtained accreditation by ACI
Disposes of 425 beds

CHIREC
Hospital sites located in Braine-l'Alleud and the Brussels-Capital Region
Has not obtained hospital-wide accreditation
Disposes of 1,052 beds (all sites)

Groupe Jolimont
Hospital sites located in Nivelles and Hainaut
Has obtained accreditation by ACI
Disposes of 885 beds (all sites)

Specialised hospitals 

SILVA medical
Geriatric, rehabilitation and psychiatric hospital
Hospital sites located in Waterloo, Wavre and the Brussels-Capital Region
Has not obtained hospital-wide accreditation
Disposes of 440 beds (all sites)

CHN William Lennox (associated with Saint-Luc)
Psychiatric hospital
Located in Ottignies-Louvain-la-Neuve
Has obtained accreditation by ACI
Disposes of 159 beds

Centre Hospitalier Le Domaine  (associated with the ULB)
Psychiatric hospital
Located in Braine-l'Alleud
Has not obtained hospital-wide accreditation
Disposes of 143 beds

La Petite Maison
Psychiatric hospital
Located in Chastre
Has not obtained hospital-wide accreditation
Disposes of 60 beds

Hainaut 
 Centre de Santé des Fagnes, Chimay
 Centre Hospitalier de Jolimont-Lobbes, La Louvière and Lobbes
 Centre Hospitalier EpiCura, Ath, Baudour and Hornu (ULB)
 Centre Hospitalier Régional, Mons and Boussu
 CH de Mouscron, Mouscron
 CHU de Charleroi, Charleroi (ULB)
 CHU Tivoli, La Louvière (ULB)
 CHR Haute-Senne (UCLouvain - ULB)
 Saint Vincent, Soignies
 Le Tilleriau, Soignies
 Centre Médical Brainois, Braine-le-Comte
 Centre Médical de Tubize, Tubize
 Centre Médical d’Enghien, Enghien
 Le Goéland, Neufvilles
 CHR Clinique Saint-Joseph, Colfontaine (UCLouvain)
 CHR Mons-Hainaut, Mons (UCLouvain)
 CHWAPI (Centre Hospitalier de Wallonie picarde), Tournai
 CNDG (Clinique Notre-Dame de Grâce), Gosselies (UCLouvain)
 Grand Hôpital de Charleroi, Charleroi
 Hôpital Ambroise Paré, Mons (ULB)
 Hôpital de Warquignies, Colfontaine (UCLouvain)

Namur 
 CHR de Namur, Namur
 CHR Val de Sambre, Sambreville
CHU UCLouvain Namur (UCLouvain)
 CHU UCLouvain Sainte-Élisabeth, Namur
 Centre Hospitalier de Dinant, Dinant
 CHU UCLouvain Mont-Godinne, Yvoir
 Saint-Luc Bouge, Namur
 Beau Vallon Psychiatric Hospital, Saint-Servais (UCLouvain Saint-Luc)

Liège 
 Groupe santé CHC, Liège
 Centre Hospitalier du Bois de l'Abbaye et de Hesbaye, Seraing
 Centre Hospitalier Peltzer La Tourelle, Verviers
 CHR Citadelle, Liège (ULiège)
 CHR Huy, Huy
 CHU de Liège, Liège (ULiège)
 Clinique St. Josef, Saint-Vith
 Hôpital St. Nikolaus, Eupen

Luxembourg 

Vivalia
Six hospital sites (five general and one psychiatric) 
Hospital sites located in Arlon, Bastogne, Bertrix, Libramont-Chevigny, Marche-en-Famenne and Virton
Has not obtained hospital-wide accreditation
Disposes of 1,190 beds (all sites)

See also 
 Healthcare in Belgium

External links 
 Belgian Hospital Association (Belgische Vereniging der Ziekenhuizen – Association belge des Hôpitaux)
 Conference of Academic Hospitals of Belgium (Raad van Universitaire Ziekenhuizen van België – Conférence des Hôpitaux Académiques de Belgique)

References 

 Gezondheidszorginstellingen [Health care institutions]. www.health.belgium.be (in Dutch). FPS Public Health, Food Chain Safety and Environment. Retrieved 14 September 2019.
 JCI-Accredited Organizations. www.jointcommissioninternational.org Joint Commission International. Retrieved 14 September 2019.
 Overzicht instellingen [Overview institutions]. www.niaz.nl (in Dutch). Nederlands Instituut voor Accreditatie in de Zorg. Retrieved 14 September 2019.
 Internationally Accredited Organizations. accreditation.ca Accreditation Canada. Retrieved 14 September 2019.

List
Belgium
Hospitals
Belgium